The Indian Journal of Gender Studies is a triannual peer-reviewed academic journal with a focus on a holistic understanding of society, particularly gender. The editors-in-chief are Malavika Karlekar and Leela Kasturi (Indian Council of Social Science Research). The journal is published by SAGE Publications on behalf of the Indian Council of Social Science Research.

Abstracting and indexing 
The journal is abstracted and indexed in:

According to the Journal Citation Reports, the journal has a 2015 impact factor of 0.231, ranking it 33rd out of 40 journals in the category "Women's Studies".

See also 
 List of women's studies journals

References

External links 
 
 Centre for Women's Development Studies, Indian Council of Social Science Research, New Delhi, India

English-language journals
Publications established in 1994
SAGE Publishing academic journals
Triannual journals
Women's studies journals